Edward Wilkinson may refer to:
 Edward Wilkinson (bishop) (1837–1914), English Anglican bishop
 Edward Wilkinson (naturalist) (1846–1918), American naturalist and museum curator
 Edward Wilkinson (cricketer) (1853–1881), English soldier and cricketer
 Edward A. Wilkinson, United States Navy admiral
 Ed Wilkinson (1890–1918), Major League Baseball player